Deric J. Ruttan (born January 27, 1972) is a Canadian country music singer, songwriter and record producer from Bracebridge, Ontario, Canada.  A Nashville, Tennessee resident, he has released four studio albums and has written or co-written more than 60 songs that have been recorded by other recording artists.

Breakthrough
Deric moved to Nashville in 1994 to pursue his music career, spending his days writing songs and his nights scouring the city getting ideas and learning from local singer-songwriters. He got his break in 1999 when producer Steve Bogard heard one of Deric's tapes and liked it. Steve signed Deric to a songwriting deal and immediately began recording his first demos. After Doug Howard at Lyric Street Records heard his demo and Deric played five songs live for Randy Goodman, Deric entered a record deal with the label. In 2003, he released his debut album, Deric Ruttan.

Songwriting
In 2003, just as his first single "When You Come Around," was released, he celebrated his first No. 1 as a songwriter when friend and collaborator Dierks Bentley took the Ruttan/Bentley/Brett Beavers co-write "What Was I Thinkin'" to the top of the charts in the US. The song helped set Bentley on the path to country stardom. (To date, Bentley has recorded six Ruttan co-writes, including the 2005 chart-topper Lot of Leavin' Left To Do.) In 2004 Ruttan's "My Way", recorded by Aaron Pritchett, was the most-played Canadian country song of that year. Capitol Nashville's Eric Church had an American Billboard hit with his and Ruttan's "Guys Like Me" in 2007, and cuts on other acts followed, on artists like Gary Allan, Paul Brandt, Doc Walker, Jason Blaine, and The Higgins.

In September 2007, Ruttan was awarded his first Canadian Country Music Award (CCMA) for Songwriter of the Year (along with co-writers Aaron Pritchett and Mitch Merrett), for "Hold My Beer", recorded by Pritchett. He won the CCMA for songwriter of the year once again in 2014 for "Mine Would Be You," recorded by Blake Shelton.

Ruttan has written and co-written songs for prominent country musicians including Dierks Bentley ("What Was I Thinkin'" and "Lot of Leavin' Left to Do"), Aaron Pritchett ("Hold My Beer" and "My Way"), Jason Aldean ("Any Ol' Barstool"), Eric Church ("Guys Like Me" and "Hell on the Heart"), and Blake Shelton ("Mine Would Be You and Came Here to Forget").

Since 2011, Deric has written for Nashville-based publishing company THiS Music. He renewed his deal with THiS Music in 2016.

As a recording artist
It took over four years for Ruttan to follow up his 2003 self-titled release. In 2008 he released his second album, aptly titled First Time in a Long Time, which yielded four hit radio singles at Canadian country radio: the title track, "Lovin' You Is Killin' Me", "California Plates" (co-written with members of Manitoba country band Doc Walker), and "Good Time", a duet with Bentley. (The video for "Good Time" reached No. 1 on CMT Canada's video countdown).

"It wasn't just that writing songs for other artists was taking time away from me writing my next record", says Ruttan. "It was that suddenly I was known as a guy who'd written radio hits for other acts – the bar had been raised for me, creatively, because of that. I felt the next record I made needed to be really, really good."

At the 2008 Canadian Country Music Awards, Ruttan earned a total of four nominations – "Male Artist", "Songwriter", "Record Producer", and "Best Album," and closed the show performing alongside The Guess Who/Bachman Turner Overdrive guitar legend Randy Bachman. By the following year, "First Time In A Long Time" had garnered so much radio airplay that it earned Ruttan and co-writer Jimmy Rankin a SOCAN Country Music Award at the 2009 SOCAN Awards in Toronto.

In January 2010, with "Sunshine," Deric began releasing albums on his own independent label, Black T Records. He captured live audio on Sunshine's supporting tour to create 2011's live album, "Up All Night – Deric Ruttan Live." He released his most recent album, "Take the Week Off," in October 2013.

He has found success as an artist on Canadian country radio, and he continues to balance touring to support his albums with songwriting at home. "I’ve never been happier with the balance in my career," he says. "I tour about as much as I’d ever want to. Jason Blaine, Chad Brownlee and I recently did 25 shows across Canada in the Your Town Throwdown tour, and I played festivals in the summer. That lets me get my performance ya-yas out, and I’m in Nashville writing the rest of the time. Considering I haven’t lived there in 20 years, I feel really embraced by Canada."

Discography

Studio albums

Live albums

Singles

2000s

2010s

Music videos

Awards and nominations

References

External links
Official website

1972 births
306 Records artists
Canadian country singer-songwriters
Canadian male singer-songwriters
Living people
People from Bracebridge, Ontario
Musicians from Nashville, Tennessee
21st-century Canadian male singers
Canadian Country Music Association Songwriter(s) of the Year winners